The Adventures of Robin Hood is a 1938 American Technicolor swashbuckler film from Warner Bros. Pictures. It was produced by Hal B. Wallis and Henry Blanke, directed by Michael Curtiz, and stars Errol Flynn, Olivia de Havilland, Basil Rathbone, Claude Rains, Patric Knowles, Eugene Pallette, and Alan Hale, Sr. The film is particularly noted for its Academy Award-winning score by Erich Wolfgang Korngold.

The film was written by Norman Reilly Raine and Seton I. Miller. The storyline depicts the legendary Saxon knight Robin Hood, who in King Richard the Lionheart's absence in the Holy Land during the Crusades, fights back as the outlaw leader of a rebel guerrilla band against Prince John and the Norman lords oppressing the Saxon commoners.

The Adventures of Robin Hood has been acclaimed by critics since its release. In 1995, the film was deemed "culturally, historically, or aesthetically significant" by the United States Library of Congress and selected for preservation by the National Film Registry.

Alan Hale, Sr., who plays Little John, had played the same character in Douglas Fairbanks's 1922 version of the film and went on to play him again in Rogues of Sherwood Forest, released by Columbia in 1950, a 28-year span.

Plot

Richard, the Norman King of England, is taken captive in 1191 by Duke Leopold while returning from the Third Crusade. Richard's treacherous brother Prince John, aided by fellow Norman Sir Guy of Gisbourne, names himself regent of England, increasing the Saxons' taxes under the pretense of gathering a ransom for Richard.

The Normans exploit and oppress the Saxons. Sir Robin of Locksley, a Saxon noble, opposes the brutality and rescues Much the Miller's Son from being executed for poaching, earning Gisbourne's ire. Robin later confronts Prince John at a Nottingham Castle banquet, telling the assembled guests that he regards John's declaring himself regent as treason. John orders Robin's execution, but he escapes and flees with Much and Will Scarlet into Sherwood Forest. John seizes Robin's lands and names him outlaw.

Much is sent to recruit men to join their band. Robin and Will encounter John the Little on a log bridge, and after a quarterstaff contest, welcome him into their ranks. Dozens more men join Robin's band, swearing an oath to dispoil the rich while aiding the poor, to fight injustice, and to show courtesy to all oppressed. They start a war against John and Gisbourne, dispatching those who abuse their power.

Robin's band encounters the rotund Friar Tuck, a renowned swordsman. Tuck joins the band and assists in capturing a company of Normans transporting a shipment of gathered taxes. In the company are Gisbourne, the cowardly Sheriff of Nottingham, and King Richard's ward Lady Marian. After their capture, the men are humiliated at a celebratory woodland banquet, with Marian given a seat of honor. Initially scornful, she comes to share Robin's views after he shows her examples of Norman brutality against the Saxons. Robin sends the convoy back to Nottingham Castle, telling them that they have Marian's presence to thank for their lives being spared.

Having noted Robin's focus on Marian during the Sherwood banquet, the sheriff suggests hosting an archery tournament, with the Lady Marian presenting a golden arrow as the prize to entrap Robin. Robin enters the tournament, is recognized by his archery skill, and is captured and sentenced to be hanged. Marian aids Robin's Men in a scheme to save him. After his daring escape, he scales the palace walls to thank her, and the two pledge their love for one another. Marian declines Robin's marriage proposal, electing to instead remain in the castle as a spy.

King Richard returns with several of his knights. The Bishop of the Black Canons sees through Richard's disguise and alerts John. John sends disgraced former knight Dickon Malbete to kill Richard, promising Dickon Robin's title and lands. Marian overhears and writes to Robin, but is found out by Gisbourne and sentenced to death. Her nursemaid, Bess, tells Much everything. He intercepts Dickon and kills him after a fight.

Richard and his men, disguised as Norman monks, travel through Sherwood and are stopped by Robin. Assuring Robin they are on the king's business, Richard accepts Robin's offer of hospitality and his condemnation of Holy Crusade, but does not reveal his identity.

Much relays Bess' news. Robin orders his men to find and protect Richard; now certain of Robin's loyalty, Richard reveals himself. Robin coerces the Bishop of the Black Canons to allow them to join his monks in disguise so they can enter Nottingham castle. Once inside, Richard announces his presence, and a huge melee erupts. Robin kills Gisbourne after a lengthy duel, frees Marian, and prompts John's men to surrender.

Back on his throne, Richard banishes John and restores Robin's rank, raising him to Baron of Locksley and Earl of Sherwood and Nottingham. The king also pardons Robin's men, and commands Robin to take the hand of the Lady Marian in marriage. As Robin exits the castle with her, he responds "May I obey all your commands with equal pleasure, sire".

Cast
 Errol Flynn as Robin Hood
 Olivia de Havilland as Maid Marian
 Basil Rathbone as Guy of Gisbourne
 Claude Rains as Prince John
 Patric Knowles as Will Scarlet
 Eugene Pallette as Friar Tuck
 Alan Hale, Sr. as Little John
 Melville Cooper as High Sheriff of Nottingham
 Ian Hunter as King Richard the Lion-Heart
 Una O'Connor as Bess
 Herbert Mundin as Much
 Montagu Love as the Bishop of the Black Canons
 Leonard Willey as Sir Essex
 Robert Noble as Sir Ralf
 Kenneth Hunter as Sir Mortimer
 Robert Warwick as Sir Geoffrey
 Colin Kenny as Sir Baldwin
 Lester Matthews as Sir Ivor
 Harry Cording as Dickon Malbete
 Howard Hill as Captain of Archers (also Elwyn the Welshman [uncredited])
 Ivan F. Simpson as Proprietor of Kent Road Tavern

Uncredited:
 Lionel Belmore as Humility Prin (proprietor of Saracens Head Tavern)
 Charles Bennett as Peddler at Tournament
 Frank Hagney as Man-at-arms
 Holmes Herbert as Archery Referee
 Crauford Kent as Sir Norbett
 Carole Landis as Guest at Banquet
 Leonard Mudie as Town Crier
 Reginald Sheffield as Herald at Archery Tournament
 Trigger as Lady Marian's horse

Production
The Adventures of Robin Hood was produced at an estimated cost of $2 million, the most expensive film Warner Bros. had made up to that time. It was also the studio's first film utilizing the three-strip Technicolor process. The film was, in fact, planned to be shot in black and white for most of its development; the switch to Technicolor happened just three months before production started. It was an unusually extravagant production for the Warner Bros. studio, which had made a name for itself in producing socially conscious, low-budget gangster films.

Producer Hal B. Wallis is generally seen as the film's creative helmsman. The first draft of the script was written by Rowland Lee, but Wallis objected to its heavily archaic and fanciful dialogue (one line he cited was "Oh my lord, tarry not too long, for I fear that in her remorse she may fling herself from the window. Some harm may befall her, I know."). At Wallis's insistence, the script was heavily rewritten to modernize the dialogue, and whether any of Lee's work survives in the completed film is unclear.

The scene in which Robin Hood first meets Prince John, Guy of Gisbourne, and Maid Marian went through several iterations. Initially, the scene was to be at a jousting tournament with Robin tilting against Guy of Gisbourne, mimicking the 1922 Douglas Fairbanks production of Robin Hood, but screenwriter Norman Reilly Raine pointed out that a banquet scene would be much less expensive to produce, and so long as Technicolor was employed, would look just as lavish to the average moviegoer. In another draft, instead of a deer, a slain villager was who Robin Hood brought in and dumped on Prince John's table. Wallis felt the use of a dead villager expended all the tension of the scene in "a momentary kick", and preferred the use of a deer from an earlier draft, which allowed the tension to simmer with the threat of an explosion at any moment.

James Cagney was originally cast as Robin Hood, but walked out on his Warner Bros. contract, paving the way for the role to go to Errol Flynn. The filming was postponed three years as a result. Though Olivia de Havilland was an early frontrunner for the role of Maid Marian, for a time, the studio vacillated between Anita Louise and her for the part. De Havilland was ultimately chosen because the success of Captain Blood established the pairing of Flynn and de Havilland as a safe bet to help ensure box-office success.

Location work for The Adventures of Robin Hood included Bidwell Park in Chico, California, which substituted for Sherwood Forest, although one major scene was filmed at the California locations "Lake Sherwood" and "Sherwood Forest", so named because they were the location sites for the Fairbanks production of Robin Hood. Several scenes were shot at the Warner Bros. Burbank Studios and the Warner Ranch in Calabasas. The archery tournament was filmed at the former Busch Gardens, now part of Lower Arroyo Park, in Pasadena.

Scenes which were filmed, but not included in the final cut include the disguised King Richard brawling with Friar Tuck, and Robin riding off with Maid Marian; the latter would have been the concluding scene of the film, and appears in the theatrical trailer despite not appearing in the film itself.

Stunts
All the arrows in the film were shot by professional archer Howard Hill. Those shot with arrows wore clothing padded with balsa wood on protective metal plates; the metal plates prevented injury (though impact was fairly painful), and the arrows lodged into the balsa wood to create the illusion of bodily penetration. Hill, although listed as the archer captain defeated by Robin, was cast as Elwen the Welshman, an archer seen shooting at Robin in his escape from Nottingham Castle, and later, defeated by Robin at the archery tournament. To win, Robin splits the arrow of Philip of Arras, a captain of the guard under Gisbourne, who had struck the bullseye. Hill did, in fact, split one arrow with another during filming (albeit while firing from a much closer range than from which Robin Hood is portrayed as shooting), but it did not look good enough on film, so the shot was redone with some effects trickery. Stuntman Buster Wiles, a close friend of Errol Flynn's and his frequent on-set stand-in, maintained that the arrow-splitting stunt was carried out using an extra-large arrow (for the target) and that the second arrow had a wide, flat arrowhead and was fired along a wire. This wire can briefly be seen attached to the fletching of the arrow, in the final film. Wiles discusses the scene in his autobiography, My Days with Errol Flynn.

Flynn performed most of his own stunts in the film; exceptions include Robin jumping onto a horse with hands tied behind his back (during the hanging scene), scaling the fortress gate and coming down the other side, and a few select shots in the duel between Robin and Guy of Gisbourne.

Music score
In 1938, Erich Wolfgang Korngold was conducting opera in Austria when he was asked by Warner Bros. to return to Hollywood and compose a score for The Adventures of Robin Hood. Music historian Laurence E. MacDonald notes that many factors made the film a success, including its cast, its Technicolor photography, and fast-paced direction by Michael Curtiz, but "most of all, there is Korngold's glorious music". Also, film historian Rudy Behlmer describes Korngold's contribution to this and his other films:

In reply to Warner Bros.’ request, Korngold told studio head of production Hal B. Wallis that he was a composer of drama and the heart, and felt little connection to what he perceived as "a 90% action picture." Wallis was persistent, and Korngold finally agreed to begin composing on the condition that he not have a contract, and work on a week-by-week basis so that he could withdraw if he were dissatisfied with the music he composed. However, Korngold later admitted that the real reason he changed his mind was Adolf Hitler's November 1937 meeting with Austrian ministers, which convinced Korngold that the situation was no longer safe in his home country. As Korngold feared, Austria was annexed by the Nazis, and his home in Vienna was confiscated. This meant that all Jews in Austria were now at risk, so Korngold stayed in America until the end of World War II.

Korngold called his film scores "Opern ohne Singen", operas without singing, but otherwise approached their composition just as he would for the operatic stage. The Adventures of Robin Hood was, therefore, a large-scale symphonic work, and despite the studio music department's providing a team of orchestrators, including future Oscar-winner Hugo Friedhofer, to assist Korngold, the amount of work was immense, especially for the limited time he was given to compose. In describing this dilemma to his father, Julius Korngold, one of Vienna's foremost music critics, the elder Korngold suggested that themes from his 1920 symphonic overture "Sursum Corda" ("Lift Up Your Hearts") would serve splendidly for much of the most demanding action-scene music, and Erich agreed.

It also gave him his second Academy Award for Best Original Score and established the symphonic style that was later used in action films during Hollywood's Golden Age. Modern-day epics such as the Star Wars and Indiana Jones trilogies similarly included original symphonic scores. Composer John Williams has cited Korngold as his inspiration in scoring the Star Wars series. The love theme of Robin and Marian went on to become a celebrated concert piece.

Reception
Contemporary reviews were highly positive. "A richly produced, bravely bedecked, romantic and colorful show, it leaps boldly to the forefront of this year's best", wrote Frank S. Nugent of The New York Times. "It is cinematic pageantry at its best", raved Variety. "A highly imaginative retelling of folklore in all the hues of Technicolor, deserving handsome box office returns". Film Daily called it "high class entertainment" with "excellent direction" and an "ideal choice" in the casting of Flynn. "Excellent entertainment!" wrote Harrison's Reports. "Adventure, romance, comedy, and human appeal have been skilfully blended to give satisfaction on all counts ... The duel in the closing scenes between the hero and his arch enemy is the most exciting ever filmed". John Mosher of The New Yorker called it "a rich, showy, and, for all its tussles, somewhat stolid affair", praising Flynn's performance and the action sequences but finding the "excellent collection" of supporting actors to be "somewhat buried under the medieval panoply". 
Review aggregator website Rotten Tomatoes reports that 100% of critics gave the film a positive rating based on 46 reviews, with an average score of 8.94/10. The film is among their list of the 100 best-rated films in cinema. Rotten Tomatoes summarizes the critical consensus as, "Errol Flynn thrills as the legendary title character, and the film embodies the type of imaginative family adventure tailor-made for the silver screen".

Box office
The Adventures of Robin Hood became the sixth-highest grossing film of the year, with just over $4 million in revenues at a time when the average ticket price was less than 25 cents.

According to Warner Bros records, the film earned $1,928,000 domestically and $2,053,000 overseas.

In  1938, The Adventures of Robin Hood was the seventh-highest grossing film nationally in the U.S., and the highest-grossing film the same year in the southern states of Kentucky, Tennessee, West Virginia, Alabama, Mississippi, and Arkansas.

Warner Bros. was so pleased with the results that the studio cast Flynn in two more color epics before the end of the decade: Dodge City and The Private Lives of Elizabeth and Essex.

A sequel, Sir Robin of Locksley, was announced, but never developed.

Awards and nominations

Other honors:
 In 2001 the film came in at #84 on "The Best Films of All Time" as voted on Channel 4.
 In 2001 the film appeared at #100 on AFI's 100 Years... 100 Thrills list.
 In 2003 the main character, Robin Hood, appeared as the #18 Hero on AFI's 100 Years... 100 Heroes and Villains list.
 In 2005 the film appeared at #11 on AFI's 100 Years of Film Scores list.

Legacy
The film's popularity inextricably linked Errol Flynn's name and image with that of Robin Hood in the public eye, even more so than those of Douglas Fairbanks, who had played the role in 1922. The film became a benchmark for later movie adaptations of Robin Hood.

This was the third film to pair Flynn and Olivia de Havilland (after Captain Blood and The Charge of the Light Brigade).  They would ultimately star together in nine films, the aforementioned and Four's a Crowd (1938), The Private Lives of Elizabeth and Essex (1939), Dodge City (1939), Santa Fe Trail (1940), They Died with Their Boots On (1941) and Thank Your Lucky Stars (1943), although they shared no scenes in the last film.

Scenes and costumes worn by the characters have been imitated and spoofed endlessly.  For instance, in the 1949 Bugs Bunny animated short film, Rabbit Hood, Bugs is continually told by a dim-witted Little John, "Don't you worry, never fear; Robin Hood will soon be here." When Bugs finally meets Robin at the end of the film, he is stunned to find that it is Errol Flynn, in a spliced-in clip from this film (he subsequently shakes his head and declares, "It couldn't be him!"). Other parodies were Daffy Duck and Porky Pig in Robin Hood Daffy (1958) and Goofy and Black Pete in Goof Troop episode "Goofin' Hood & His Melancholy Men" (1992).

The Court Jester, a musical comedy starring Danny Kaye, is in great measure a spoof of Robin Hood. Basil Rathbone even appears as the villain and has a climactic sword fight with Kaye.

Most of the Mel Brooks parody Robin Hood: Men in Tights relied on this film for its aesthetics, although the plot was almost completely a riff on Robin Hood: Prince of Thieves, as well as referencing the 1973 Disney version.  Mel Brooks also spoofed the Robin Hood legend in his 1975 television series When Things Were Rotten.

A fragment of one of the film's sword fighting scenes was converted to sprites by Jordan Mechner and used for his 1989 platform game Prince of Persia.

Errol Flynn's acrobatic swordplay became a crucial touchstone for the light-saber duels choreography in Star Wars movies.

In Disney’s 2010 animated film Tangled, the appearance and personality of Flynn Rider are partly inspired by that of Errol Flynn, with his surname also being used in homage.

Comic adaptation
Knockout Comic (weekly picture paper, Amalgamated Press, London) No 434, June 21, 1947 – No 447, September 20, 1947, 14 issues, 28pp in black-and-white and drawn by Michael Hubbard) Produced when the film was first revived after World War II, with several deviations made from the film's plot, the comic strip's storyline is generally faithful to the look and narrative of the Warner Bros.' film. However, the famous climactic duel between Robin and Sir Guy is reduced to a couple of strip panels, with Robin remaining dressed in his earlier monk's habit. The strip opens with a joust between Robin and Sir Guy, a scene which was in the original screenplay, but was never actually filmed.

See also
 List of films with a 100% rating on Rotten Tomatoes, a film review aggregator website

References

Notes

External links

 
 
 
 
 
 The Adventures of Robin Hood at Virtual History
 The Adventures of Robin Hood essay by Daniel Eagan in America's Film Legacy: The Authoritative Guide to the Landmark Movies in the National Film Registry, A&C Black, 2010 , pages 275-276 

1938 films
1938 adventure films
1930s American films
American epic films
1930s color films
1930s English-language films
American adventure films
Robin Hood films
Films about royalty
Films that won the Best Original Score Academy Award
Films whose art director won the Best Art Direction Academy Award
Films whose editor won the Best Film Editing Academy Award
Warner Bros. films
Films directed by Michael Curtiz
Films directed by William Keighley
Films produced by Hal B. Wallis
Films scored by Erich Wolfgang Korngold
Films set in castles
Films set in England
Films set in the Middle Ages
Remakes of American films
Sound film remakes of silent films
United States National Film Registry films
American vigilante films
Cultural depictions of Richard I of England
Cultural depictions of John, King of England